List of saints is a sortable list of Christian saints.

List of saints may also refer to:
 List of saints from Africa is a list of saints, blesseds, venerables, and Servants of God from Africa.
 List of saints from Algeria is a list of Muslim saints in Algeria.
 List of Sufi saints is a list of Sufi saints or Wali.
 List of Yazidi saints is a list of Yazidi saints.
 List of bodhisattvas is a list of beings who are dedicated to achieving complete Buddhahood.